State Road 389 (SR 389) is a north–south highway carried by East Avenue in Bay County, Florida.  The southern terminus is at US 98 BUS (SR 30) in Panama City.  The northern terminus is US 231 (SR 75) in Hiland Park where the road continues as County Road 389 (CR 389).

Before the late 1970s, the state-maintained portion actually continued south of its present terminus and dead-ended at the local paper mill.  Today, that portion of East Avenue is maintained locally.

SR 389 is continuous with CR 389, which begins at US 231 (SR 75) and ends at SR 77 in Lynn Haven.  This county-maintained stretch was signed as SR S-389 prior to the late 1970s.

Major intersections

References

External links

389
389
389